Ron Hurst (born c. 1950) is an American musician. Since 1984 he has been the drummer for American rock band Steppenwolf. He resides in Hillsboro, Oregon, in the Portland area where he teaches drums at a studio. Hurst moved from Nashville, Tennessee, to the Hillsboro area in 2003. He grew up in Holyoke, Massachusetts before moving to New York City and Nashville. His daughter is in a band called In Retrograde. In addition to drums, he has also done vocal work with the band.

References

Living people
Musicians from Hillsboro, Oregon
Steppenwolf (band) members
20th-century American drummers
American male drummers
People from Holyoke, Massachusetts
Year of birth missing (living people)